Hartshead Moor services is a motorway service station on the M62 near Brighouse, West Yorkshire. It is the highest service station in the United Kingdom.

History

Construction
The service area was built by Ross Group, after Leicester Forest East, and with Membury services.<ref>Leicester Daily Mercury"" Tuesday 19 January 1971, page 35</ref>

1974 coach bombing

On 4 February 1974, a bomb was detonated on a coach ferrying British Army and Royal Air Force personnel from and to the bases at Catterick and Darlington during a period of industrial strike action on the trains. The incident occurred between junctions 26 and 27, shortly after midnight while most of those aboard were sleeping. Twelve people died and more than fifty were injured.

A memorial plaque was installed in memory of those who were killed, situated in the entrance hall of the westbound section of the service area, which was used as a first aid station for those wounded in the blast. A memorial service was held at the service area in February 2004. In 2009, a new memorial was created outside the service area at the wishes of the relatives of those killed.

Incidents
In December 2005, the RSPCA working with the BBC filmed the sale of an African puff adder at the service area, exploiting a legal loophole to sell on the snake. It was discovered in April 2006 that the service area's toilets were frequently being used for homosexual activity.

Alpine Cleaning Services, who successfully pitched for investment on the television show Dragons' Den'', opened one of their first truck-washing facilities at the service area in August 2006.

Mural
The service station is one of fourteen for which large murals were commissioned from artist David Fisher in the 1990s, designed to reflect the local area and history.

Location
The services are located between junctions 25 and 26 of the M62.

Awards
2007 Loo of the Year award – Baby Change Facilities.

References

External links

Motorway Services Online – Hartshead Moor
Motorway Services Info – Hartshead Moor

 Welcome Break motorway service stations
 M62 motorway service stations
 Buildings and structures in Calderdale